The 2017 IPSC Handgun World Shoot XVIII was the 18th IPSC Handgun World Shoot held at the new National Shooting Center in Châteauroux, France during the end of August and start of September. There were 30 stages divided into 5 areas, with each area being named after and having themes from one of the 5 continents Africa, Asia, America, Australia or Europe.

The Production division saw the hardest competition of the match with the largest match participation and the winner Ben Stoeger from USA finishing under half a point in front of Russian shooter Pavel Torgashov, pushing him down into second place with the very close final score of 99.98 %. Production division arguably had the toughest top ten competition, with a margin of only 3.8 % between first and ninth place. Maria Gushchina from Russia made an impressive performance placing both first in Lady Production and sixth in Production Overall.

Match info 
The match was very varied with many moving targets, and some stages had targets placed at distances up to 50 meters. The French Minister of Sports Laura Flessel mada an appearance showing support for the French Standard division shooter  Eric Grauffel.

Champions

Open 
The Open division had the second largest match participation with 407 competitors (27 %).

Individual

Teams Open

Standard 
The Standard division had the third largest match participation with 379 competitors (25.2 %).

Individual

Teams Standard

Production 
The Production division had the largest match participation with 487 competitors (32.3 %).

Individual

Teams Production

Classic 
The Classic division had the fourth largest match participation with 164 competitors (10.9 %).

Individual

Teams Classic

Revolver 
The Revolver division had the fifth largest match participation with 69 competitors (4.6 %).

Individual

Teams Revolver

Medal table

Shoot-Off side event 
On Sunday 3 September, the Shoot-Off side event was held in an audience friendly one-against-one elimination cup format where the competitors shot at falling steel targets (called poppers). The top 10 finishing overall and category shooters from the Main Match were qualified for the Shoot-Off. To win a round, a competitor would have to hit all his steel targets and reach the middle middle target before the other competitor. The Shoot-Off consisted of quarter finals, semi-finals, bronze and gold finals.

CZ Super Six side event 
Another side event on Sunday 3 September was the Super Six finals sponsored by CZ, where six of the best Overall and Lady shooters in the Production, Standard and Open divisions participated. Three of the Main Match stages were shot again by one competitor at a time in an elimination cup format based on their hit factor scores. Stage 16 was the first cut, afterwards stage 15 was the semifinal and lastly stage 17 was the final between the two best shooters.

See also 
 IPSC Rifle World Shoots
 IPSC Shotgun World Shoot
 IPSC Action Air World Shoot

References

External links 
 Official Match Webpage
 Official Live Results: 2017 Handgun World Shoot (WinMSS)
 Official Live Results: 2017 Handgun World Shoot (PractiScore mirror)

2017
IPSC Handgun World Shoot
Shooting competitions in France
IPSC Handgun World Shoot
International sports competitions hosted by France
IPSC Handgun World Shoot
IPSC Handgun World Shoot